Albese may refer to:

A.S.D. Albese Calcio, an Italian football club based in Alba, Piedmont
Albese con Cassano, an Italian municipality of the Province of Como, Lombardy
Montelupo Albese, an Italian municipality of the Province of Cuneo, Piedmont

See also
Alba (disambiguation)